Lieutenant-Colonel Claud Heathcote-Drummond-Willoughby (15 October 1872 – 24 February 1950) was a British Conservative Party politician.

Career
Heathcote-Drummond-Willoughby was the second son of Gilbert Heathcote-Drummond-Willoughby, 1st Earl of Ancaster, and his wife Lady Evelyn Elizabeth, daughter of Charles Gordon, 10th Marquess of Huntly. Gilbert Heathcote-Drummond-Willoughby, 2nd Earl of Ancaster, was his elder brother.

He was commissioned into the Coldstream Guards as a second lieutenant on 5 December 1891, was promoted to a lieutenant on 27 January 1897, and to captain on 20 March 1900.

He served in South Africa through the Second Boer War 1899–1902; where he was slightly wounded at the Belmont (November 1899). After recovery, he took part in operations in the Orange Free State (February to May 1900), the Transvaal (May to June 1900, July to November 1900) and Cape Colony; and was present at several major battles, including at Poplar Grove and Driefontein (March 1900), Vet River, Zand River, Johannesburg, Pretoria and Diamond Hill (June 1900), Bergendal and Komatipoort (August 1900). Following the end of the war, he returned to the United Kingdom in August 1902.

Heathcote-Drummond-Willoughby entered Parliament for Stamford in the January 1910 general election, a seat he held until 1918 when the constituency was abolished, and then represented Rutland and Stamford from 1918 to 1922.

Family
Heathcote-Drummond-Willoughby married Lady Florence Conyngham, daughter of George Conyngham, 3rd Marquess Conyngham, and widow of Bertram Frankland-Russell-Astley, in 1905. She died in January 1946. Heathcote-Drummond-Willoughby survived her by four years and died in February 1950, aged 77.

References

www.thepeerage.com

External links 
 

1872 births
1950 deaths
Younger sons of earls
Conservative Party (UK) MPs for English constituencies
Claud
UK MPs 1910
UK MPs 1910–1918
UK MPs 1918–1922